The Cluysenaar is a Belgian family notably of architects and artists.

History

The original familyroots of this catholic family originate in Tirol, Flirsch. 
Form the original branch some famous people descends, among them Erich Klausener who was killed in the Night of the Long Knives.

The Belgian branch of the family descends from Paulus Klausener, whose son Johannes-Petrus was an architect.
Joannes, an engineer in the Netherlands, was married to Gerinda Geritsen. They are the parents of Jean-Pierre.

 Jean-Pierre Cluysenaar, he was married first in 1830 to Elisabeth Puttaert and second to Adelaide Puttaert. 
 Gustave 
 Adèle Clotilde Cluysenaar: married to Gustave Jean-Jacques Saintenoy, royal architect of the Count of Flanders. 
 Paul Pierre Jean Saintenoy, architect married to Louise Ponselet, she was the daughter of Victor Nicolas Auguste Ponselet (brewer in Anderlues) and Aurore Pourbaix. ( her aunt Stephanie Pourbaix was married to Jan Verhas, founder of the School of Dendermonde )
 Jacques Saintenoy, architect married to Simone van den Perre.
 Jacqueline Saintenoy (1900–1978), married to the executed Pierre Pucheu, former French Minister of the Interior.
 Jean André Alfred Cluysenaar (1837–1902) married to Marie-Thérèse Cornélis.
 André Edmond Alfred Cluysenaar (1872 -1939) married to Alice Frances Gordon, born 1869 descendant of George Gordon Byron , 6th Baron Byron.
Jean Edmond Cluysenaar (1899–1986) married first to Sybil Fitzgerald Hewat, painter, second to Jacqueline Emilie Collier.
Anne Alice Andrée Cluysenaar married to Walt Jackson. She was murdered by her stepson Timothy Jackson.

Family tree

References

Klausener Family
 
Roman Catholic families